Rockwood Township is the name of some places in the U.S. state of Minnesota:
Rockwood Township, Hubbard County, Minnesota
Rockwood Township, Wadena County, Minnesota

Minnesota township disambiguation pages